Dudley is a large village in North Tyneside, in the county of Tyne and Wear, England. A former mining village and formerly part of Northumberland, it was the site of Annitsford railway station, originally named Dudley. Dudley Colliery was situated in the village from 1856 until its closure in 1977.

Former professional football player and coach Bobby Ferguson was born in the village.

Robson Green, an English actor, angler, singer-songwriter and presenter, is from the village and grew up there.

References 

Villages in Tyne and Wear
Metropolitan Borough of North Tyneside